Bradford is a name of Old English origin. It particularly refers to those from the City of Bradford, West Yorkshire (formerly in the West Riding of Yorkshire). Notable people and characters with the name include:

Given name 
 Bradford Anderson (born 1979), American actor
 Bradford Angier (1910–1997), American wilderness survivalist and author
 William Bradford Bishop (born 1936), known as Bradford Bishop, American former U.S. Foreign Service officer accused of killing his family
 Bradford Cox, American musician
 Bradford Delson, known as Brad Delson, guitarist with the rock band Linkin Park
 Bradford Dillman (born 1930), American actor
 Bradford Shellhammer, American entrepreneur and designer

Surname 
 Alexander Blackburn Bradford (1799–1873), Tennessee State Senator
 Chasen Bradford, American baseball player
 George W. Bradford (1796–1883), New York Senator
 James Bradford (disambiguation) or Jim Bradford, several people
 John Bradford (disambiguation), several people
 Mary Lythgoe Bradford (1930–2022), American writer
 Siôn Bradford (1706–1785), Welsh poet
 Stacey Bradford, American financial journalist, author, and commentator
 Stella Stevens Bradford (1871–1959), American medical doctor, pioneer in physical therapy
 Steven Bradford (born 1960), California State Senator
 Sue Bradford (born 1952), New Zealand activist, academic, and former politician
 William Bradford (disambiguation), several people

Fictional characters
 the title character of Brick Bradford, a science fiction comic strip
 Bradford Meade, in the television series Ugly Betty

See also 

 Bradford baronets

References

English-language given names